Unaiuba bruchi is a species of beetle in the family Cerambycidae. It was described by Melzer in 1927.

References

Clytini
Beetles described in 1927